West Palace is a 1995 South Korean television series starring Lee Young-ae, Kim Kyu-chul and Lee Bo-hee. It aired on KBS2 from July 7 to December 26, 1995, on Mondays and Tuesdays at 21:40 for 52 episodes.

Synopsis
The series is based on the reign of Gwanghaegun of Joseon, and his conflict with his stepmother, Queen Inmok, along with his scheming concubine, Kim Gae-shi.

Kim Gae-shi (portrayed by Lee Young-ae) is given Seung-eun (승은) by the regent Crown Prince, Crown Prince Gwanghae (portrayed by Kim Kyu-chul). Although Kim receives seung-eun, she already has a lover, Won-pyo (portrayed by Kim Bo-sung), an excellent swordsman, who then enters the palace to stay next to her. However, Won-pyo dies after trying to protect her during the rebellion.

Meanwhile, Queen Inmok (portrayed by Lee Bo-hee) is a virtuous lady that fell victim to palace politics and is subsequently banished to the West Palace along with her children, Princess Jeongmyeong (portrayed by Park Rusia) and Grand Prince Yeongchang (portrayed by Choi Kang-won) after her stepson, Gwanghaegun, is bewitched by his scheming concubine, Kim Gae-shi, whose ambitions and insatiable thirst for power leads to her downfall.

Cast

Main
Lee Young-ae as Court Lady Kim Gae-shi / Gae-dong
Lee Jung-hu as young Kim Gae-shi
Kim Kyu-chul as Yi Hon, Crown Prince Gwanghae, King Gwanghae
Lee Bo-hee as Queen Dowager Inmok (Soseong)
Park So-ra as young Queen Inmok

Supporting

Royal Household
Kim Sung-ok as Yi Yeon, King Seonjo
Park Jin-hyung as Yi Jong, Prince Neungyang King Injo
Lee Han-na as Royal Noble Consort In of the Suwon Kim clan
Jang Seo-hee as Crown Princess Consort Yu, Queen Yoo
Im Hyuk-joo as Yi Jin, Prince Imhae
Park Nam-hyun as Yi Je, Prince Heungan
Choi Kang-won as Yi Ui, Grand Prince Yeongchang
Park Rusia as Princess Jeongmyeong
Lee Jae-yun as Yi Bu, Prince Jeongwon, King Wonjong

Ministers and nobles
Seo In-seok as Yi I-cheom
Han In-soo as Kim Je-nam, Queen Inmok's father.
Ahn Dae-yong as Kang Hong-rip
Moon Chang-kil as Yoo Geun
Kim Jong-kyul as Heo Gyun
Su-hak as Ki Ja-hun
Shin-goo as Yi Won-ik
Park-woong as Jung Chul
Park Chil-yong as Yi San-hae
Tae Min-yung as Yoo Hee-boon
Im Byung-ki as Park Seung-jong
Kim Si-won as Yi Duk-hyung
Park Yung-mok as Yi Hang-bok
Lee Jung-woong as Yi Gwi
Park Seung-kyu as Yi Gwal
Kim Sung-chan as Kim Ja-jeom
Kim Chang-bong as Yi Kwang-jung
Kim Sung-won as Kim Yoo
Lee Doo-sup as Kim Yook
Sun Dong-hyuk as Choi Myung-kil
Lee Han-wi as General Jang Soo
Yoo Byung-han as Ha-sam
Choi Dong-joon as Lee Duk-hyung
Lee Kyung-yung as Park Ja-heung, Crown Prince Gwanghae's relative
Heo Hyun-ho as Yi Soo, Prince Gwichun
Kang In-duk as Seo Yang-kap
Kim Kyung-eung as Shim Woo-yung
Seo Yung-jin as Park Eung-su
Ahn Gwang-jin as Park Chi-ui
Kim Jung-hoon as Im Sook-yung
Park Kun-shik as Han Hee-kil
Lee Han-seung as Yun Bang
Lee Yong-jin as Kwon Pil
Jo Jae-hoon as Jung Hang
Jin Woon-sung as Yi Jung-pyo
Ki Jung-soo as Han Hyo-soon
Park Yong-shik as Yi Heung-rip
Heo Jung-kyu as Yi Ahn-jin
Jang Ki-yong as Kim Kyung-su
Park Hae-sang as Shin Kyung-jin
Sun Dong-hyuk as Choi Myung-kil
Kim Dong-wan as Choi Kwon
Choi Hun-chul as Uhm Il-goe
Lee Chun-shik as Choon Bo
Kim Bo-sung as Won-pyo
Jung Tae-woo as young Won-pyo
Seo Sang-ik as Jeong In-hong
Park Jung-woong as Eo-ui

Palace maids and eunuchs
Kim In-moon as Eunuch Ham
Lee Jong-man as Eunuch Han
Kim Eul-dong as Court Lady Uhm
Jang Jung-hee as Court Lady Ji
Kim Min-hee as Maid Eum-duk

Other families
Yang Geum-seok as Lady Kang, Kim Gae-shi's mother.
Uhm Yoo-shin as Lady No, Kim Je-nam's wife.
Park Joon-geum as Lady Lee, Lee Yi-cheom's wife.
Kim Young-ok as Lady Ryu, Lee Yi-cheom's mother.
Ko Hee-joon as Won-pyo's adoptive father.

Extended cast
Park Byung-ho as a missionary ambassador
Park Yong-gi as a Buddhist monk
Lee Hyo-jung
Seo Yung-ae
Moon Su-in
Yoo Byung-hwan
Kwon Oh-hyun

Production
It was Lee Young-ae and Choi Dong-joon first appearance in a historical drama.
The series emphasized Kim Gae-shi's role as Gwanghae's concubine so the production team added a fictional character, Won-pyo, who is Lady Kim's lover, to promote a love conflict.

References

Korean Broadcasting System television dramas
South Korean historical television series
Television series set in the Joseon dynasty
1995 South Korean television series debuts
1995 South Korean television series endings